The Kondurcha (Kondırça) is a river in Samara Oblast and Tatarstan, Russian Federation, a right-bank tributary of the river Sok. It begins in Samara Oblast and flows to the Sok in Samara Oblast.

Major tributaries are the Shlama and Lipovka rivers. The maximal mineralization 700-800 mg/L. Nurlat is along the river.

See also
Battle of the Kondurcha River

References 

Rivers of Tatarstan
Rivers of Samara Oblast